Sir Francis Fortescue (ca. 1563–1624), KB was an English politician.

Life
Francis was the eldest surviving son of John Fortescue of Salden at Mursley and his wife, Cecily Ashfield. His brothers were William Fortescue and Thomas Fortescue II.

In 1589, he married Grace Manners (d. 1624), daughter of Sir John Manners of Haddon Hall, second son of Thomas Earl of Rutland, and of Dorothy Vernon daughter and co-heir of Sir George Vernon. They had at least one son, his heir, John. A daughter, Dorothy Vernon (d. 1650), married Sir Robert Throckmorton of Weston Underwood, Buckinghamshire and Coughton Court.

Career
In 1600, he became the Custos Rotulorum of Buckinghamshire and in 1608 High Sheriff of Buckinghamshire. In 1589, 1593 and 1597 he was MP for Buckingham, and in 1601 MP for Buckinghamshire.

References

1560s births
1624 deaths
High Sheriffs of Buckinghamshire
17th-century English people
Knights of the Bath
English MPs 1589
English MPs 1593
English MPs 1597–1598
English MPs 1601